Euspondylus excelsum is a species of lizard in the family Gymnophthalmidae. It is endemic to Peru.

References

Euspondylus
Reptiles of Peru
Endemic fauna of Peru
Reptiles described in 2017
Taxa named by German Chavez
Taxa named by Alessandro Catenazzi
Taxa named by Pablo J. Venegas